Pearce is a given name. Notable people with the name include:

Pearce Bailey (1865–1922), American neurologist and psychiatrist, 
Pearce Chiles (1867–1933), American baseball player
Pearce Paul Creasman (born 1981), archaeologist 
Pearce Hanley (born 1988), Australian rules footballer 
Pearce Johnson, sports editor and American football executive
Pearce Lane (1930–2018), American boxer
Pearce Quigley, English actor
Pearce Young (1918–1984), American politician
Pearce Wright (1933–2005), British science journalist

See also
Peirce (given name)
Pierce (given name)
Pearce (surname)